Breena Clarke is an African-American scholar and writer of fiction, including an award-winning debut novel River, Cross My Heart (1999). She is the younger sister of poet, essayist, and activist Cheryl Clarke, with whom she organizes the Hobart Festival of Women Writers each summer.

Biography
One of four sisters and a brother born in Washington, D.C., to James Sheridan Clarke (September 18, 1912 – January 18, 2009), a veteran of World War II, and Edna Payne Clarke, Breena Clarke was educated at Webster College and at Howard University.

Her debut novel, River, Cross My Heart, was an October 1999 Oprah Book Club selection, when the description stated:"This highly accomplished first novel resonates with ideas, impassioned lyricism, and poignant historical detail as it captures an essential part of the African-American experience in our century." The Publishers Weekly reviewer called it "a novel as lyric and alternately beguiling and confounding as its title. ...a haunting story", and the book spent a month on The New York Times bestseller list.

Clarke's second novel, Stand the Storm, was published in 2008, and The Washington Post reviewer Gail Buckley said: "Breena Clarke has written another stirring work of historical fiction that weaves the passionate, dramatic and uplifting story of the African American aspiration for true freedom into the great American tapestry." Clarke's third novel, Angels Make Their Hope Here, published in 2014, also received favorable notices from such reviewers as Alan Cheuse at NPR's All Things Considered.

Bibliography
 River, Cross My Heart, Back Bay Books, 1999, 
 Stand the Storm: A Novel, 2008
 Angels Make Their Hope Here, Little, Brown and Company, 2014,

Awards
 1999: New Atlantic Independent Booksellers Association (NAIBA) award for fiction
 2000: Alex Award from the Young Adult Library Services Association

References

External links
 Official website.
 Jacqueline Cutler, "A conversation with Breena Clarke", New Jersey On-Line, August 10, 2014.
 "Interview with Breena Clarke", HerStoryNovels, June 23, 2016.

Living people
21st-century American novelists
Writers from Washington, D.C.
Howard University alumni
African-American novelists
American women novelists
21st-century American women writers
Year of birth missing (living people)
21st-century African-American women writers
20th-century African-American writers
21st-century African-American writers